Gerald Merlin (3 August 1884 – 7 April 1945) was a British sports shooter. He competed at the 1906 Intercalated Games and the 1908 Summer Olympics. At the 1906 Intercalated Games he won a gold and bronze medal.

References

External links
 

1884 births
1945 deaths
British male sport shooters
Olympic shooters of Great Britain
Shooters at the 1906 Intercalated Games
Shooters at the 1908 Summer Olympics
Olympic medalists in shooting
Medalists at the 1906 Intercalated Games
Sportspeople from Athens